Cassiterite is a tin oxide mineral, SnO2.  It is generally opaque, but it is translucent in thin crystals. Its luster and multiple crystal faces produce a desirable gem. Cassiterite was the chief tin ore throughout ancient history and remains the most important source of tin today.

Occurrence

Most sources of cassiterite today are found in alluvial or placer deposits containing the weathering-resistant grains. The best sources of primary cassiterite are found in the tin mines of Bolivia, where it is found in crystallised hydrothermal veins. Rwanda has a nascent cassiterite mining industry. Fighting over cassiterite deposits (particularly in Walikale) is a major cause of the conflict waged in eastern parts of the Democratic Republic of the Congo.  This has led to cassiterite being considered a conflict mineral.

Cassiterite is a widespread minor constituent of igneous rocks. The Bolivian veins and the 4500 year old workings of Cornwall and Devon, England, are concentrated in high temperature quartz veins and pegmatites associated with granitic intrusives. The veins commonly contain tourmaline, topaz, fluorite, apatite, wolframite, molybdenite, and arsenopyrite. The mineral occurs extensively in Cornwall as surface deposits on Bodmin Moor, for example, where there are extensive traces of a hydraulic mining method known as streaming. The current major tin production comes from placer or alluvial deposits in Malaysia, Thailand, Indonesia, the Maakhir region of Somalia, and Russia. Hydraulic mining methods are used to concentrate mined ore, a process which relies on the high specific gravity of the SnO2 ore, of about 7.0.

Crystallography

Crystal twinning is common in cassiterite and most aggregate specimens show crystal twins. The typical twin is bent at a near-60-degree angle, forming an "elbow twin". Botryoidal or reniform cassiterite is called wood tin.

Cassiterite is also used as a gemstone and collector specimens when quality crystals are found.

Etymology
The name derives from the Greek kassiteros for "tin": this comes from the Phoenician word Cassiterid referring to the islands of Ireland and Great Britain, the ancient sources of tin; or, as Roman Ghirshman (1954) suggests, from the region of the Kassites, an ancient people in west and central Iran.

References

External links

Tin minerals
Oxide minerals
Tin mining
Rutile group
Tetragonal minerals
Minerals in space group 136